David William Coleman (1881 – 13 March 1951) was a New Zealand politician of the Labour Party.

Biography

Early life
He was born in London in 1881, and lived as a child and young man in Queensland. He worked as a carpenter and later as a furniture salesman. He joined the local debating society and maintained an interest in the vocation for the rest of his life.

In 1902, aged 21, he emigrated to New Zealand and first lived in Wellington, before moving to Gisborne where he established his own retail business. In 1904 he married Julia Jane Bigwood and had two children.

Political career

Coleman became secretary of the Poverty Bay Labourers' Union and then became secretary of the Gisborne branch of the Social Democratic Party (SDP). Coleman supported the merger of the SDP into the New Zealand Labour Party and was on the Labour Party's first national executive, serving on it and the Gisborne LRC for twenty-one years.

He was Mayor of Gisborne for two separate spells, from 1927–33 and 1935–41. He was likewise a member of the Cook Hospital Board, Poverty Bay Power Board and Gisborne Fire Board.

He retired in 1949 owing to ill health.

From 1942 until 1947 he was the Labour Party's junior whip. Coleman was then Parliamentary Under-Secretary to the Minister of Works from 1947 to 1949.

Later life and death
In 1935, he was awarded the King George V Silver Jubilee Medal.

Coleman died on 13 March 1951, aged 69, survived by his second wife, son and daughter. He was buried at Taruheru Cemetery, Gisborne. He had been predeceased by his wife, Julia Jane Coleman, in 1941.

Notes

References

1881 births
1951 deaths
New Zealand Labour Party MPs
Social Democratic Party (New Zealand) politicians
Members of the New Zealand House of Representatives
New Zealand MPs for North Island electorates
Unsuccessful candidates in the 1928 New Zealand general election
Unsuccessful candidates in the 1925 New Zealand general election
Mayors of Gisborne, New Zealand
New Zealand trade unionists
Burials at Taruheru Cemetery
Members of district health boards in New Zealand
British emigrants to New Zealand